This is a list of British television related events from 1959.

Events

January
1 January – The first broadcast of the Vienna New Year's Concert from Austria airs on BBC Television.
15 January – Tyne Tees Television, the ITV franchise for North East England, goes on air.

February
No events.

March
No events.

April
No events.

May
No events.

June
1 June – Juke Box Jury premieres on the BBC Television Service.

July
No events.

August
No events.

September
25 September – 5th series of Hancock's Half Hour begins broadcast, all made as telerecordings. It includes, on 16 October, the classic parody episode "Twelve Angry Men". Anthony Hancock decides that he no longer wishes to work with Sid James.

October
8–9 October – The BBC and, for the first time, ITV broadcast live coverage of the results of the 1959 United Kingdom general election. The BBC keeps the overnight coverage but does not retain its broadcast from the following day.
27 October – Anglia Television, the ITV franchise for Eastern England, goes on air.
31 October – Ulster Television, the ITV franchise for Northern Ireland, goes on air.

November
No events.

December
No events.

Debuts

BBC Television Service/BBC TV
 7 January –  The Nightwatchman's Stories (1959)
 14 January – The Cabin in the Clearing (1959)
 17 January – The Honey Siege (1959)
 23 January – The Third Man (1959–1965)
 30 January – The Last Chronicle of Barset (1959)
 4 February – Face to Face (1959–1962)
 9 February – The Scarf (1959)
 28 February – Garry Halliday  (1959–1962)
 25 March – Morning in the Streets (1959)
 3 April – Love and Mr Lewisham (1959)
 4 April – Charlesworth (1959)
 4 April – Drumbeat (1959)
 5 April – Great Expectations (1959)
 8 April –  The Two Charleys (1959)
 14 April – The Offshore Island (1959)
 22 April – A Soho Story (1959)
 1 May – Frankly Howerd  (1959)
 15 May – Hilda Lessways (1959)
 1 June 
 Juke Box Jury (1959–1967, 1979, 1989–1990)
 The Widow of Bath (1959)
 3 June – On the Bright Side (1959)
 12 June – The Adventures of Brigadier Wellington-Bull (1959)
 26 June – The Eustace Diamonds (1959)
 5 July – The Golden Spur (1959)
 13 July – The Naked Lady (1959)
 25 July – The Ken Dodd Show (1959–1969)
 10 August – Campion (1959–1960)
 23 August – The Moonstone (1959)
 26 August – Call Me Sam (1959)
 28 August – The History of Mr. Polly (1959)
 3 September – Spycatcher (1959–1961)
 11 September – Noggin the Nog (1959–1965; 1982)
 21 September – A Mask for Alexis (1959)
 28 September – The Artful Dodger (1959)
 11 October – Redgauntlet (1959)
 15 October – Who, Me? (1959)
 16 October – Bleak House (1959)
 2 November – The Men from Room 13 (1959–1961)
 3 November – Ask For King Billy (1959)
 7 November – Three Golden Nobles (1959)
 11 December – Para Handy - Master Mariner (1959–1960)
 Unknown 
Whicker's World (1959–1994)
World Theatre (1959)

ITV
 8 April – Crime Sheet (1959)
 1 June – Don't Tell Father (1959)
 14 June – Sunday's Child (1959)
 2 July – Skyport (1959–1960)
 6 July – Something in the City (1959)
 13 July – Nick of the River (1959)
 10 August – Gert and Daisy (1959)
 1 September – The Secret of Carrick House (1959)
 12 September – The Man Who Finally Died (1959)
 13 September – Interpol Calling (1959–1960)
 14 September – Probation Officer (1959–1962)
 16 September – No Hiding Place (1959–1967)
 17 September – The Four Just Men (1959–1960)
 23 September –  Tell It to the Marines (1959–1960)
 13 October – Knight Errant Limited (1959–1961)
 31 October – Epilogue to Capricorn (1959)
 9 December – 77 Sunset Strip (1958–1964)
 12 December – The Voodoo Factor (1959–1960)
 24 December 
Rawhide (1959–1965)
Tales from Dickens (1959–1961)
 26 December – International Detective (1959–1961)
 28 December – Ivor the Engine (1959, 1975–1977)
Unknown 
Torchy the Battery Boy (1959–1961)
Maverick (1957–1962)
Glencannon (1959–1960)
The Flying Doctor (1959)
Foo Foo (1959–1960)

Continuing television shows

1920s
BBC Wimbledon (1927–1939, 1946–2019, 2021–2024)

1930s
The Boat Race (1938–1939, 1946–2019)
BBC Cricket (1939, 1946–1999, 2020–2024)

1940s
Come Dancing (1949–1998)

1950s
Andy Pandy (1950–1970, 2002–2005)
All Your Own (1952–1961)
Watch with Mother (1952–1975) 
Rag, Tag and Bobtail (1953–1965)
The Good Old Days (1953–1983)
Panorama (1953–present)
The Adventures of Robin Hood (1955–1960)
Picture Book (1955–1965)
Sunday Night at the London Palladium (1955–1967, 1973–1974)
Take Your Pick! (1955–1968, 1992–1998)
Double Your Money (1955–1968)
Dixon of Dock Green (1955–1976)
Crackerjack (1955–1984, 2020–present)
Hancock's Half Hour (1956–1961)
Opportunity Knocks (1956–1978, 1987–1990)
This Week (1956–1978, 1986–1992)
Armchair Theatre (1956–1974)
What the Papers Say (1956–2008)
The Army Game (1957–1961)
The Sky at Night (1957–present)
Blue Peter (1958–present)
Grandstand (1958–2007)

Ending this year
 The Adventures of Twizzle (1957–1959)
 The Adventures of William Tell (1958–1959)
 The Invisible Man (1958–1959)
 Ivanhoe (1958–1959)
 Oh Boy! (1958–1959)
 Our Mutual Friend (1958–1959)
 Quatermass and the Pit (1958–1959)
 Torchy the Battery Boy (1958–1959)

Births
 30 January – Alex Hyde-White, actor
 15 February – Adam Boulton, television journalist
 20 March – Steve McFadden, actor
 1 April – Joanna Kanska, actress
 15 April – Emma Thompson, actress, comedian, and screenwriter
 8 May – Kevin McCloud, designer, author, and television host
 16 May – Tracy Hyde, actress and model
 22 May – Jon Sopel, television presenter and BBC correspondent
 29 May – Adrian Paul, actor
 11 June – Hugh Laurie, actor, comedian and writer
 29 June – Richard Vranch,  comedian, actor, and TV panel show participant
 8 July – Pauline Quirke, actress 
 10 September – Helen Pearson, actress
 7 October – Simon Cowell, music producer and television talent show judge
 20 October – Niamh Cusack, Irish-born actress
 2 November – Peter Mullan, actor
 9 November – Tony Slattery, actor and comedian
 11 November – David Easter, actor
 13 November – Caroline Goodall, actress 
 14 November – Paul McGann, British actor
 24 November – Lucy Meacock, journalist and newsreader
 30 November – Lorraine Kelly, Scottish presenter and journalist
 2 December – Gwyneth Strong, British actress
 3 December – Eamonn Holmes, journalist and television personality
 11 December – Nigel Pivaro, actor and journalist
 30 December – Tracey Ullman, English comedian, actress, singer, dancer, screenwriter and author

See also
 1959 in British music
 1959 in the United Kingdom
 List of British films of 1959

References